Charlotte of the Palatinate (Princess Palatine Charlotte; 19 December 1628 – 14 January 1631), was the fourth daughter of Frederick V, Elector Palatine (of the House of Wittelsbach), the "Winter King" of Bohemia, by his consort, the English princess Elizabeth Stuart. Charlotte was born in the Dutch Republic, where her family had sought refuge after the sequestration of their Electorate during the Thirty Years' War. Charlotte's brother Charles Louis was, as part of the Peace of Westphalia, restored to the Palatinate.

Biography 
Princess Charlotte was born in The Hague, where her parents lived in exile after her father lost the Battle of White Mountain and was driven from the thrones of both Bohemia and the Palatinate.

Her paternal grandparents were Frederick IV and Louise Juliana of Nassau and maternal grandparents were James VI of Scotland and Anne of Denmark. She died on 14 January 1631, and her father, a Calvinist, died on 29 November 1632, the year after her.

Ancestry

References

Bibliography 
 Carl Eduard Vehse: Geschichte der deutschen Höfe seit der Reformation: 4. Abth., Geschichte der Höfe der Häuser Baiern, Würtemberg, Baden und Hessen; 2. Th, Band 24, Hoffmann und Campe, 1853, S. 101 (in German)

Charlotte
Simmern, Edward, Count Palatine of
1628 births
1631 deaths
Charlotte
Charlotte
17th-century Bohemian people
17th-century Bohemian women
Daughters of kings
Royalty and nobility who died as children